Raymond Kopka (born 20 December 1971) is a British weightlifter. He competed in the men's heavyweight II event at the 1992 Summer Olympics.

References

External links
 

1971 births
Living people
British male weightlifters
Olympic weightlifters of Great Britain
Weightlifters at the 1992 Summer Olympics
Sportspeople from Nitra